At 3:50 pm EST, on January 11, 2019, an OC Transpo double-decker bus, operating on route 269 to Kanata, crashed on approach to Westboro Station, Ottawa, Canada, by swerving and striking the bus shelter at the station. Part of the upper deck of the bus was torn off on impact, killing three people on board, as well as injuring 23 others. The driver was arrested at the scene for allegedly failing to cooperate with police, and was released with no charges laid.

Investigation 
The Ottawa Police Service are leading the investigation into the collision. From the early hours, experts, the public and politicians called on the City of Ottawa to invite the Transportation Safety Board, TSB, an independent federal agency that advances transportation safety, to conduct a full safety investigation.

On January 16, five days after the crash, the Ottawa police accepted an offer of technical assistance from the TSB. The Ottawa police stated that the skills of the TSB would augment the reconstruction portion of the investigation especially in terms of collision reconstruction, human factors and electronic data gathering, based on the TSB's engineering expertise in collision reconstruction and analysis of vehicle and road design.

The bus crash falls outside the current mandate of the TSB, which includes only air, rail, marine and pipeline transportation. Without jurisdiction, the TSB could not lead a full investigation, or have the authority to make national safety recommendations based on their findings. Investigators have ruled out impaired driving as the cause of the collision.

Aftermath
On August 23, 2019, it was reported that 38 charges of dangerous driving have been laid against the bus driver. The city of Ottawa and OC Transpo were cleared of criminal wrongdoing.

In September 2021, the driver, Aissatou Diallo was acquitted of all charges. According to Judge Webber, "The "oppressive" sun setting in front of her was "obviously a hazard," while an "errant" and misleading road marking led her directly into a snow-filled gutter, contributing to the crash."

References

2019 disasters in Canada
Bus incidents in Canada
Accidental deaths in Ontario
2019 road incidents
OC Transpo
January 2019 events in Canada
2019 in Ontario
Transitway (Ottawa)
2010s in Ottawa
2010s road incidents in North America
Bus transport in Ottawa
Disasters in Ottawa